Hall Tavern is an historic tavern at 20 Gray Gardens West Street in Cambridge, Massachusetts.  Now converted to residential use, this two story Federal style wood-frame building was built in sometime in the late 1790s in Duxbury, Massachusetts, and was moved to this location in 1930.  The building is one of a number that were moved in order to preserve them in the early decades of the 20th century, and it is now one of the centerpieces of the Gray Gardens subdivision.

The building was listed on the National Register of Historic Places in 1983.

See also
National Register of Historic Places listings in Cambridge, Massachusetts

References

Commercial buildings completed in 1720
Drinking establishments on the National Register of Historic Places in Massachusetts
Houses in Cambridge, Massachusetts
National Register of Historic Places in Cambridge, Massachusetts
Taverns in Massachusetts
Federal architecture in Massachusetts
Georgian architecture in Massachusetts
Individually listed contributing properties to historic districts on the National Register in Massachusetts
1720 establishments in Massachusetts